Roland Hemmo (born 25 February 1946 in Weißwasser, East Germany) is a German actor who specializes in television and dubbing. Roland Hemmo is one of the most successful voice actors in the history of German cinema.  He has worked for over 1000 Hollywood productions since 1978.
Roland Hemmo lives in Berlin, is married with Heike in June 2016, and has two children, Sophie Johanna and Max.

Career
After he finished college, he joined the most famous acting school in Germany, “Ernst-Busch-Hochschule”. He acted in over 1500 performances at some of the most important stages in Germany: Deutsches Theater Berlin, Staatsoper Berlin, Komischer Oper. His voice acting career began with the leading role in the Russian production from Stanislaw Lem's “Test pilota Pirxa”.

Movies
A small selection out of 1000 movies as a voice actor
 The Departed
 The Good Shepherd
 The Omen
 The Black Dahlia
 Eragon
 X-Men
 V for Vendetta
 Dreamgirls
 Match Point
 Harry Potter
 Kingdom of Heaven
 Dark Water
 Elizabethtown
 The Producers
 Brokeback Mountain
 Sin City
 King Kong
 Madagascar (2005 film) - Maurice

Older movies
 Starship Troopers
 Ocean's Eleven // Twelve // Thirteen
 Crimson Tide
 Instinct
 CopyKill
 Mission: Impossible
 Amistadt
 Perdita Durango
Rules of Engagement
 Con Air
 Troy
 The Lord of the Rings
 Master and Commander
 The Last Samurai
 The Bourne Identity
 The Ring
 Blair Witch 2
 Gangs of New York
 Catch Me If You Can
 The Matrix Revolutions
 The Matrix Reloaded
 Starsky and Hutch
 The Wedding Planner
 Enigma
 13th Floor
 Se7en
 The Bodyguard
 Any Given Sunday
 Jimmy Hoffa
 Pleasantville
 12 Monkeys
 Collateral Damage
 Romeo + Juliet
 City of Angels
 Jurassic Park - Lost World
 Sleepers
 Ransom
 Eine Frage der Ehre
 L.A. Confidential
 Lilo & Stitch
 Star Wars II and III
 Fargo
 Forrest Gump
 Mars Attacks!

TV shows
A selection of TV shows where you can hear Roland Hemmo
 Winnie Pooh – Narrator
 Gilmore Girls
 Grey's Anatomy
 Star Trek: Deep Space Nine
 Lilo & Stitch
 Six Feet Under
 Millennium
 Numb3rs
 Stargate Atlantis
 Roseanne
 Starhunter
 Gargoyles
 Welcome, Mrs. President
 Malcolm in the middle
 X-Files
 Impy's Wonderland
 Jakers! The Adventures of Piggley Winks – Wiley

Actors
A selection out of over 400 actors which are spoken by Roland Hemmo.
 Samuel L. Jackson
 Christopher Lee
 Tom Hanks
 Delroy Lindo
 Brendan Gleeson
 Alfred Molina
 Martin Sheen
 Steve McQueen
 Jean Reno
 Donald Sutherland
 Warren Clarke
 John Noble
 Colm Meaney
 George W. Bailey
 Phil Davies
 Morten Grunwald
 Daniel Von Bargen
 Mel Brooks
 Martin Scorsese
 Oliver Stone
 Forest Whitaker

External links
 
 
 
 Picture
 Soundfile
 Homepage
 Website
 German Database

1946 births
Living people
People from Weißwasser
German male voice actors
German male television actors